Roderick Macleod or MacLeod may refer to:

Roderick MacLeod (Old Rory) (c. 1500 – c. 1595), chief of Clan MacLeod of Lewis
Roderick Macleod of Macleod (1573–1626),  15th chief of Clan Macleod
Roderick Macleod, 2nd of Cadboll (died 1770), Scottish Jacobite and rebel
Roderick Macleod, 4th of Cadboll (1786–1853), Scottish politician
Roderick Macleod (Alberta politician) (1908–2004), provincial level politician from Alberta, Canada
Roderick John MacLeod, Lord Minginish (born c. 1953), Scottish lawyer, chairman of the Scottish Land Court since 2014
Roderick MacLeod (minister) (1754–1815), principal of King's College, Aberdeen, 1800–1815
Roddy MacLeod (born 1962), Scottish bagpipe player

See also
Roderick McLeod (disambiguation)